Representations of the Middle Ages frequently occur in cultural media, from literature, drama, and film to comics, reenactment, and video games. Examples include:

General
 Historical reenactment
 Medievalism and Neo-medievalism
 Middle Ages in film

Early Middle Ages

 List of translations and artistic depictions of Beowulf

King Arthur in various media
Lady Godiva in popular culture
Irish mythology in popular culture
Vikings in popular culture
Viking revival
Norse mythology in popular culture

High Middle Ages 
Knights Templar and popular culture
Robin Hood in popular culture
List of films and television series featuring Robin Hood

Late Middle Ages
 Knight-errant
Cultural depictions of Joan of Arc

Islamic Golden Age
Scheherazade in popular culture
One Thousand and One Nights in world culture

References